Naeviella is a genus of fungi in the family Calloriaceae. It has three species. The genus was circumscribed by American plant ecologist Frederic Clements in 1909.

Species
 Naeviella paradoxa 
 Naeviella poeltiana 
 Naeviella volkartiana

References

Leotiomycetes
Leotiomycetes genera
Taxa described in 1909
Taxa named by Frederic Clements